Hapalopeza is an Asian genus of praying mantis in the family Gonypetidae.  Two species, previously placed here, are now in the genus Spilomantis.

Species
The Mantodea Species File lists:
 Hapalopeza fulmeki Werner, 1926
 Hapalopeza nigricornis Stal, 1877
 Hapalopeza nilgirica Wood-Mason, 1891
 Hapalopeza nitens Saussure, 1871 - type species
 Hapalopeza periyara Mukherjee & Hazra, 1985
 Hapalopeza tigrina Westwood, 1889

References

External links
 

Mantodea genera
Iridopteryginae
Insects of Southeast Asia